Dox may refer to:

Chemistry
 Desferrioxamine, a chelating agent used to remove excess iron from the body
 Dissolved oxygen, a relative measure of the amount of oxygen that is dissolved or carried in a given medium
 Doxorubicin, an anthracycline antibiotic used in cancer therapy
 DOx, 2,5-dimethoxy, 4-substituted amphetamines
 Doxycycline, a semi-synthetic tetracycline

People
 Arthur Wayland Dox, a biologist who popularized Czapek-Dox medium
 Dox (poet), born Jean Verdi Salomon Razakandrainy (1913–1978), a significant poet from Madagascar
 Gerrit L. Dox (1784–1847), an American politician, New York State Treasurer
 Myndert M. Dox (1790–1830), an American soldier and government official
 Peter Myndert Dox (1813–1891), an American politician. 
 Vril Dox, a DC Comics character

Other uses
 Dox, a white dwarf star named SDSS J1240+6710 which contains a nearly pure oxygen atmosphere 
 dox, an IO/FDIS 639-3 code for Bussa language
 Dox, a type of Warez
 Dornier Do X, the German aircraft
 Direct oximetry
 Canid hybrid, a supposed hybrid between a fox and a dog
 Doxing, Internet-based researching and publishing personally identifiable information about an individual
 Design of experiments, a statistical approach to experimental design

See also
 Dock (disambiguation)